Romance on the Range may refer to:

Romance on the Range (album), a 1955 album by Patti Page
Romance on the Range (film), a movie starring Roy Rogers